Peter of Damascus or Peter Damascene was a Byzantine Christian monastic, theologian, and Church Father who lived in the 12th century. He is notable for being the second most voluminous author in the Philokalia.

Biography 
Little is known about the life of Peter of Damascus, partly due to the lack of a hagiographical account of his life and partly due to his confusion with another Peter of Damascus who lived some 400 years earlier. This confusion may have its origin in Volume 3 of the Philokalia in which Nicodemus the Hagiorite misattributes writings to the 8th century Peter.

The Peter of Damascus in question lived in the 12th century during the climax of monastic reform within Byzantium. He was a monk, as is attested to by his own words, using such phrases as "us monks", speaking about his "monastic habit" and describing himself as a "fully-tested monk". Furthermore, Peter mentions in the text that he lived in a cell, never owned any books or possessions, and was under the guidance of a spiritual father. Peter himself identifies three types of monastic life; cenobitic, eremitic, and semi-eremitic. While it is not known for certain in which style of monasticism he lived or where he was from, the textual evidence suggests that he likely followed the semi-eremitic lifestyle. The title "of Damascus" does not necessarily mean that Peter was born in Damascusas is the case with the more famous John of Damascus.

It is generally thought that Peter wrote his works  AD. This timeframe comes from a 13th-century manuscript in the Vatican and a 14th-century manuscript in Paris which agree. Additionally, Peter mentions Symeon the Metaphrast in his writings (who died in the last quarter of the tenth century) which means that he at least must have lived sometime after him.

Works 
The neptic works of Peter of Damascus form a wide array of practical spiritual advice written for monastics. He emphasizes the importance of both ascetic labor and of the grace of God in salvation.

According to the Greek Index Project, there are 107 known manuscripts with writings attributed to Peter of Damascus. These writings are replete with quotations from the Fathers, including Athanasius of Alexandria, Anthony the Great, Basil of Caesarea, Dionysius the Areopagite, Isaac the Syrian, John of Damascus, John Chrysostom, and Abba Philimon. Since Peter writes that he never owned any books or possessions, it is likely that he wrote all of these quotes from memory. This would explain his occasional slight misquotations.

There are two general schools of thought with regard to the originality of Peter of Damascus' spiritual teachings. On the one hand, historian Jean Gouillard maintains that there is little originality in Peter's work, but rather that he faithfully teaches exactly what was handed down to him from the Fathers. In Gouillard's own words, "In summary, entirely concentrated on putting into clear formulas the teachings of the greatest contemplatives of the east, the Damascene does not invent, nor does he prepare anything." This dismissal could explain the lack of academic research on Peter of Damascus. On the other hand, Rev. Dr. Greg Peters argues that Peter did in fact contribute to spiritual theology with original work, "Although Gouillard correctly places Peter in the mainstream of the Byzantine monastic tradition, he fails to do complete justice to Peter's innovative use of that tradition."

A notable theme in Peter's writing is his position that salvation is not only for monastics, but for laypeople as well. For example, he writes in one place that "marriage is natural" and that "if someone wants to be saved, no person or no time, place or occupation can prevent him." These words reveal his position that the spiritual life is available to both monastics and non-monastics even if monasticism was seen as superior. As Bishop Kallistos Ware says, "Although writing for monks, he [Peter] insists that salvation and spiritual knowledge are within the reach of everyone; continual prayer is possible in all situations without exception."

The Philokalia 

In 1782, Nicodemus the Hagiorite and Macarius of Corinth published an anthology of teachings from Christian spiritual masters of the 4th through 15th centuries, called the Philokalia. The Philokalia was compiled and edited from manuscripts that were available to Nicodemus at Vatopedi and other monasteries on Mount Athos. The book was initially published in Venice with the title "Philokalia of the Sacred Neptic Ones".

The writings of Peter of Damascus, which exist in this anthology, were first translated from Greek to Slavonic by Paisius Velichkovsky and have since been translated into many more languages. Describing his joy at finding the works of Peter on Athos in the 18th century, Paisius says, "When the brother returned to the cell, I began to ask him with great joy and unutterable astonishment, how it was that such a book, beyond all my hopes, was to be found in this holy place." Notably, Theophan the Recluse's Russian translation of the Philokalia, called the Dobrotoliubie, omits the writings of Peter, probably because they had been translated into Russian earlier by hieromonk Juvenal Polovtsev at Optina Hermitage (who subsequently became the archbishop of Vilnius, Lithuania).

Manuscripts 
Of the 107 known manuscripts that contain writings attributed to Peter of Damascus, most have been edited and subsumed into the two treatises or books of Peter which exist in the Philokalia and make him the most quoted author after Maximus the Confessor, taking up a large portion of volume three. According to Jean Gouillard, the division of manuscripts between the two books of Peter in the Philokalia is as follows:

Book 1 manuscripts 

 Vatican City, Bibliotheca Apostolica Vaticana, Pal. gr. 210 (13th century)
 Paris, Bibliothèque Nationale, Ancien gr. 1134 (14th century)
 Oxford, Bodleian, Barocc. 133 (14th century)
 Athos, M. Iberon, Ms gr. 700 (14th century)
 Moscow, Gostudarstvennyi Istoricheskii Muzei, Sinod. gr. 420 and 421 (15th century)

Book 2 manuscripts 

 Athos, M. Lauras, Ms gr. K 125 (15th century)
 Athos, M. Lauras, Ms gr. Λ 24 (16th century)
 Athos, Sk. Annes 8 (17th century)
 Athos, M. Staur., Ms gr. 92 (17th century)

Structure 
As mentioned before, Peter's writings in the Philokalia are divided into two major books that offer a wide array of practical spiritual advice. In the words of Nicodemus of Hagiorite, "[Peter's writings are] a recapitulation of holy watchfulness... a circle within a circle, a concentrated Philokalia within the more extended Philokalia."

 Book 1: A Treasury of Divine Knowledge
 Introduction
 The Seven Forms of Bodily Discipline
 The Seven Commandments
 The Four Virtues of the Soul
 Active Spiritual Knowledge
 The Bodily Virtues as Tools for the Acquisition of the Virtues of the Soul
 The Guarding of the Intellect
 Obedience and Stillness
 The Eight Stages of Contemplation
 The First Stage of Contemplation
 The Second Stage of Contemplation
 The Third Stage of Contemplation
 The Fourth Stage of Contemplation
 The Fifth Stage of Contemplation
 The Sixth Stage of Contemplation
 The Seventh Stage of Contemplation
 The Eighth Stage of Contemplation
 That there are No Contradictions in Holy Scripture
 The Classification of Prayer according to the Eight Stages of Contemplation
 Humility
 Dispassion
 A Further Analysis of the Seven Forms of Bodily Discipline
 Discrimination
 Spiritual Reading
 True Discrimination
 That we should not Despair even if we Sin Many Times
 Short Discourse on the Acquisition of the Virtues and on Abstinence from the Passions
 How to Acquire True Faith
 That Stillness is of Great Benefit to those Subject to Passion
 The Great Benefit ofTrue Repentance
 God's Universal and Particular Gifts
 How God has done All Things for our Benefit
 How God's Speech is not Loose Chatter
 How it is Impossible to be Saved without Humility
 On Building up the Soul through the Virtues
 The Great Value of Love and of Advice given with Humility
 That the Frequent Repetition found in Divine Scripture is not Verbosity
 Spurious Knowledge
 A List of the Virtues
 A List of the Passions
 The Difference between Thoughts and Provocations
 Book 2: Twenty-Four Discourses (which correspond to the twenty-four letters of the Greek alphabet)
 Spiritual Wisdom
 The Two Kinds of Faith
 The Two Kinds of Fear
 True Piety and Self-Control
 Patient Endurance
 Hope
 Detachment
 Mortification of the Passions
 The Remembrance of Christ's Sufferings
 Humility
 Discrimination
 Contemplation of the Sensible World
 Knowledge of the Angelic Orders
 Dispassion
 Love
 Knowledge of God
 Moral Judgment
 Self-Restraint
 Courage
 Justice
 Peace
 Joy
 Holy Scripture
 Conscious Awareness in the Heart

Editing 
The compilers of the Philokalia slightly edited the writings of Peter, which although it does not alter the content of the text significantly, occasionally shortens it. For example, the manuscript supplies the line:Λέω όχι στη λαιμαργία και την πορνεία, για χάρη του αυτοκυριαρχίας.  Και η ψυχή απωθείται από τα ίδια της τα μάτια, η επιθυμία για μυρωδιές.  και περιττά λεφτά (...gluttony and unchastitythrough self-control; and the sweet-smelling soul itself is being thrown off by the desire of food; and superfluous possessions...)While the Philokalia renders it shortened as:Λέω όχι στη λαιμαργία και στην πορνεία και στα περιττά χρήματα, αρκούμενος σε εδώ, σύμφωνα με τον Απόστολο. (...gluttony, unchastity and superfluous possessionsand so that we may be content with what we have, as the apostle puts it.)Additionally, in places where a quote is misattributed by Peter, the text of the Philokalia often does not print the misattribution.

Lists of Virtues and Passions 
Peter of Damascus provides two exhaustive lists of virtues (228 in total) and passions (298 in total). These lists exist in book one of the Philokalia.

Select quotations 
All quotes are translations of the original Greek, taken from The Philokalia: The Complete Text compiled by St. Nikodimos of the Holy Mountain and St. Makarios of Corinth, translated from Greek by Palmer, Sherrard, and Ware.

 Knowledge comes like light from the sun. The foolish man through lack of faith or laziness deliberately closes his eyesthat is, his faculty of choiceand at once consigns the knowledge to oblivion because in his indolence he fails to put it into practice.
 What health and sickness are to the body, virtue and wickedness are to the soul, and knowledge and ignorance to the intellect. 
 If we bring all this to mind, we will be amazed at God's compassion, and with trembling will marvel at His forbearance and patience. We will grieve because of what our nature has lost angel-like dispassion, paradise and all the blessings which we have forfeitedand because of the evils into which we have fallen: demons, passions and sins.
 The pure in heart are those who have accomplished every virtue reflectively and reverently and have come to see the true nature of things. In this way they find peace in their thoughts.
 If you turn from all other activity and give yourself entirely to the cultivation of the virtues of soul and body...then the tears of joy and understanding will well up copiously within you and you will drink from their plenitude.
 Each virtue lies between two unnatural passions. Moral judgment lies between craftiness and thoughtlessness; self-restraint, between obduracy and licentiousness; courage, between overbearingness and cowardice; justice between over-frugality and greed.
 By means of the virtues of soul and body, and after many struggles, a person is enabled to rise noetically, by Christ's grace, and to engage in spiritual labourthe labour of the intellectso that he begins to grieve inwardly for his own soul.

See also 

 Philokalia
 Eastern Christian monasticism
 Eastern Orthodoxy
 Nicodemus the Hagiorite
 Macarius of Corinth
 Church Fathers

Further reading 

 Gouillard, Jean (1939). Un auteur spirituel byzantin du XIIᵉ siècle, Pierre Damascène. Échos d'Orient. Reprinted in: La vie religieuse à Byzance. London: Variorum Reprints, 1981.
 Peters, Greg (2011). Peter of Damascus: Byzantine Monk and Spiritual Theologian. Toronto: Pontifical Institute of Mediaeval Studies. .
 Peter, Greg (2005). Recovering a Lost Spiritual Theologian: Peter of Damascus and the Philokalia. St. Vladimir's Theological Quarterly, pp. 437–459.
 Palmer, G. E. H.; Sherrard, Phillip; Ware, Kallistos, eds (1984). The Philokalia: The Complete Text compiled by St. Nikodimos of the Holy Mountain and St. Makarios of Corinth. London: Faber and Faber. .

References

Saints
Eastern Orthodox monks
Philokalia
12th-century Christian saints
12th-century Christian texts
12th-century Christian theologians
Eastern Christian monasticism
Church Fathers